"F2F" is a song by American singer-songwriter SZA from her second studio album, SOS (2022). "F2F" is a rock song that draws from genres such as country, pop rock, and grunge. SZA wrote the song with Lizzo, who provides background vocals, and producers Rob Bisel and Carter Lang. The song was one of around five rock-inspired songs SZA created for SOS, conceived out of a desire to experiment with various genres outside of her usual R&B works. The song begins with acoustic guitar strums before transitioning into a chorus backed by drums and power chords from electric guitars. The lyrics talk about having sex with someone to cope with breaking up with a former partner.

The song had a positive reception for its experimentation with rock. "F2F" was one of 20 tracks from SOS that debuted on the US Billboard Hot 100, bolstered by around 13.7 million streams. Consequently, it became SZA's first song to debut atop Billboard Alternative Streaming Songs chart.

Background and release
SZA released her debut studio album, Ctrl, in 2017. Primarily an R&B album that deals with themes like heartbreak, Ctrl was widely acclaimed by critics for its vocal performances, as well as the relatability, emotional impact, and candid nature of its songwriting. The album solidified her status as one of the most well-known R&B artists of her time.

SZA alluded to potentially releasing her second album as early as August 2019 during an interview with DJ Kerwin Frost. Commenting on the creative process behind the album, she stated it would be as candid and personal as Ctrl: "This next album is even more of me being less afraid of who am I when I have no choice? When I'm not out trying to curate myself and contain." When SZA collaborated with Cosmopolitan for their February 2021 issue, she spoke about her creative process behind the album's conception. She told the magazine, "this album is going to be the shit that made me feel something in my...here and in here", pointing to her heart and gut.

During interviews in 2020 and 2022, SZA said the album's composition was eclectic; while some tracks were balladic or soft, certain parts of the album had an "aggressive" sound. She stated: "I have no idea what it sounds like to anybody else. I really don't know. It's so bizarre. It's weird that I can't put my finger on it. It's a little bit of everything." The album, apart from exploring "traditional" R&B that had been a staple of SZA's past works, also drew from genres such as alternative rock and country. Punch, CEO of SZA's record label Top Dawg Entertainment, commented on the new musical direction by saying "it's a new chapter. She's not scared to try certain things now."

From April to May 2022, SZA told media outlets that she had recently finished the album in Hawaii, saying it was her most relatable or "unisex" body of work she had made to date. In a Consequence cover story, she further commented on her plans to experiment with various genres. She asserted it was "lazy" to reduce her to an R&B artist: "I love making Black music, period. Something that is just full of energy. Black music doesn't have to just be R&B. We started rock 'n' roll. Why can't we just be expansive and not reductive?" In October, she said that she had written around 100 songs for the album and added that the album could be released "any day now". During a Billboard cover story published in November, SZA revealed that the title of her second album was SOS, scheduled for release sometime next month. On December 3, 2022, she appeared on Saturday Night Live and announced it would be released on December 9. Two days later, she posted the track list on Twitter. Out of 23 songs, "F2F" appears as the album's 13th track.

Recording and composition 
Originally titled "Charlatan", "F2F" was one of around five rock songs that SZA created for SOS. She explained to Rolling Stone that these songs contained heavily confessional lyrics that demonstrated several versions of herself: "They were all terrible in terms of, like, saying bad things about what I've done to people, but it sounded cool, and I think that's what all those songs are really about. Just being super honest and letting that out." Rob Bisel and Carter Lang, producers of "F2F", revealed that American singer and rapper Lizzo was coincidentally in the same studio as SZA when she recorded the song. They added that it was one out of several songs on which the two collaborated during recording sessions; a few days prior, it was announced that Lizzo would feature on a song from the deluxe edition of SOS titled "Boy from South Detroit".

According to music journalists, "F2F" can be classified under stadium rock, pop rock, pop punk, grunge, and country. The first verse demonstrates its country influences—in it, SZA sings over acoustic guitar strums—after which drums and power chords from electric guitars appear for the chorus to indicate its punk and rock elements. Critics found the song reminiscent of rock music from the late 1990s to the early 2000s, drawing comparisons to artists like Avril Lavigne, Fefe Dobson, Paramore, and Liz Phair. 

To create "F2F", SZA freestyled or improvised lyrics over an initial version of the beat with Lizzo, who helped write the song's bridge and provided pitched-up background vocals. She originally had a verse in the song, but it was removed for unspecified reasons. The lyrics discuss having sex with people to cope with a rebound, or a period of time after the end of a romantic relationship.

Reception 
After the release of SOS, 20 tracks from the album debuted on the Billboard Hot 100, the United States's main record chart for songs. Among of them was "F2F", which was the 16th highest charting track; it debuted at number 55 and helped increase SZA's total amount of chart entries to 37. It was bolstered by around 13.7 million streams in its first opening week; with these streaming numbers, the song debuted atop Billboard Alternative Streaming Songs chart, her first number 1 there. Alternative Songs is a component chart of Hot Rock & Alternative Songs, on which "F2F" peaked at number 3.

The song received a positive response from fans and critics for its rock-infused production, which was a departure from the R&B sound of SZA's earlier works. Isabella Sarmiento, writing for NPR, picked "F2F" as one of the best songs of 2022.

Charts

References

2022 songs
Songs written by SZA
Songs written by Lizzo
SZA songs
American pop punk songs
Grunge songs